The term designer label refers to clothing, luxury automobile manufacturers and other personal accessory items sold under an often prestigious marque which is commonly named after a designer, founder, or a location-like where the company was founded (such as BMW). The term is most often applied to luxury goods. While members of the upper middle class, or the mass affluent, are perhaps the most commonly targeted customers of these designer labels, some marquees—such as Cartier, Rolex, Montblanc and the haute couture — tend to a wealthier customer base. But almost every designer brand has merchandise that the middle-class wouldn't normally be able to afford, such as exotic skins, furs and hides, limited edition pieces, or things simply priced higher. Designer label companies use their smaller and cheaper merchandise, aimed at the middle class, such as wallets, fashion jewellery, key-rings and small accessories, to make the majority of their income, whilst the more expensive pieces such as haute couture, high jewellery, hand-bags, shoes and even furnishings are usually reserved for the wealthier upper-class clientele.

Many big designer labels focus on haute couture and marketing while licensing the production of their cheaper merchandise to others. In the eyewear industry for example brands like Burberry, Chanel, Armani and Prada license their brand names to market leaders like Luxottica.

Many department stores themselves may be considered designer labels, such as Neiman Marcus, Harrods, David Jones and Daimaru.

Designer labels are not only restricted to the fashion design industry. Many car and motorcycle companies such as Rolls-Royce, Harley-Davidson and Mercedes-Benz are regarded as designer labels. These companies make their vehicles to a higher standard than the average manufacturers and many other attributes such leather used in the upholstery, woodwork and paneling, high levels of technology, extra safety and speed are employed to make for a better product. These vehicles are also in high demand all over the world, and waiting lists may be applied to some models, such as the Rolls-Royce Phantom and the Bugatti Veyron.

Many people consider designer labels to be a status symbol.

Some research indicates that products with designer labels on them are perceived as higher in quality and fashionability than the same products without designer labels. Other studies show evidence that brand names do influence consumers perception of price, but not of quality of the products.

The relationship between consumer products and social status is highly debated.

List

 Arc'teryx
 Armani
 Attolini
 Ted Baker
 Manolo Blahnik
 Thom Browne
 Hugo Boss
 Burberry
 Tory Burch
 Canali
 Cavalli
 Chanel
 Charles & Keith
 Kenneth Cole
 Comme des Garçons
 Brunello Cucinelli
 Capri
 Jimmy Choo
 Michael Kors
 Versace
 Versus
 Dolce & Gabbana
 Escada
 Etro
 Ferragamo
 Ferré
 Fiorucci
 Tom Ford
 Diane von Fürstenberg
 Furla
 Jean Paul Gaultier
 Goyard
 Hermès
 Tommy Hilfiger
 Isaia
 Marc Jacobs
 Betsey Johnson
 Donna Karan
 Calvin Klein
 Kiton
 Lacroix
 Lacoste
 Karl Lagerfeld
 Helmut Lang
 Lanvin
 Guy Laroche
 Lardini
 Ralph Lauren
 Judith Leiber
 Nanette Lepore
 Monique Lhuillier
 Phillip Lim
 Dan Liu
 Christian Louboutin
  Steve Madden
 Tomas Maier 
 Léo Marciano
 Maison Margiela
 Lana Marks
 Stella McCartney
 Issey Miyake
 Missoni
 Moschino
 Mouawad
 Thierry Mugler
 Mulberry
 Maria Pinto
 Zac Posen
 Prada
 Miu Miu
 Emilio Pucci
 Billy Reid
 Oscar de la Renta
 Sergio Rossi
 Sonia Rykiel
 Elie Saab
 SabyaSachi
 Proenza Schouler
 Paul Smith
 Kate Spade
 Anna Sui
 Elie Tahari
 Tahiliani
 Tiffany & Co.
 Philip Treacy
 Trussardi
 Valentino
 Giambattista Valli
 John Varvatos
 Kering
 Gucci
 Yves Saint Laurent
 Boucheron
 Bottega Veneta
 Balenciaga
 Alexander McQueen
 Brioni
 Girard-Perregaux
 Qeelin
 Pomellato
 Christopher Kane
 Ulysse Nardin
 LVMH
 Celine
 Dior
 Fendi
 Givenchy
 Loro Piana
 Louis Vuitton
 OTB
 Marni
 Viktor & Rolf
 Puig
 Carolina Herrera
 Paco Rabanne
 E. Marinella
 Alexander Wang
 Vera Wang
 Vivienne Westwood
 Jason Wu
 Wooyoungmi
 Yohji Yamamoto
 Giuseppe Zanotti
 Zegna

References

Goods (economics)